Luis Miguel Enciso Recio (8 April 1930 – 28 October 2018) was a Spanish historian and politician.

Biography 
Enciso was born on 8 April 1930 and earned a doctorate in history from the University of Valladolid in his hometown. Enciso began his academic career at his alma mater, then joined the faculty of the Complutense University of Madrid in 1980. He served on the Senate from 1977 to 1982, as a representative of the Union of the Democratic Centre. In 1999, Enciso was appointed to the Real Academia de la Historia.

References

1930 births
2018 deaths
20th-century Spanish historians
University of Valladolid alumni
Academic staff of the University of Valladolid
Academic staff of the Complutense University of Madrid
Union of the Democratic Centre (Spain) politicians
Members of the Senate of Spain
Spanish male writers
People from Valladolid
Members of the Real Academia de la Historia
Recipients of the Order of Constitutional Merit
Officiers of the Ordre des Palmes Académiques
Grand Cross of the Order of Civil Merit
Recipients of the Civil Order of Alfonso X, the Wise
20th-century Spanish politicians